This is a list of higher education Lutheran colleges and universities in the United States:

Current institutions
Affiliations:

CLC = Church of the Lutheran Confession
ELCA = Evangelical Lutheran Church in America
ELS = Evangelical Lutheran Synod
Ind. = Independent Lutheran
LCMS = Lutheran Church–Missouri Synod
WELS = Wisconsin Evangelical Lutheran Synod

Former institutions

See also
Concordia University System
List of ELCA colleges and universities
List of Calvinist educational institutions in North America
List of Lutheran denominations in North America
List of Lutheran seminaries in North America

References

 
Lutheran
Lutheran